BHFanaticos is the largest supporters group in Bosnia and Herzegovina who follow Bosnian national sport teams mostly in football, basketball, handball and sitting volleyball. Members are located throughout Europe, United States and Australia.

Since the Bosnian national anthem has no lyrics, BHFanaticos sing lyrics from the old national anthem Jedna si jedina.

On BHFanaticos logo there is a lily. It is based on Lilium bosniacum which is native to Bosnia and Herzegovina. It is a historical symbol related to the House of Kotromanić who ruled the Kingdom of Bosnia in medieval period and also found in the former flag of Bosnia.

Controversy 
On 24 March 2007 during match between Bosnia and Herzegovina and Norway at the Ullevål Stadium in Oslo. BHFanaticos and other Bosnian fans caused an hour-long delay due to an unprecedented amount of flares that had been thrown onto the pitch in protest against corruption of Bosnia and Herzegovina football federation president Munib Ušanović, who later has been sentenced to five years in jail over tax fraud.

References

External links
Official Website
Official Website 
Official Website

Association football supporters' associations
Bosnia and Herzegovina football supporters' associations
Fanaticos